Coralliophila australis is a species of sea snail, a marine gastropod mollusc in the family Muricidae, the murex snails or rock snails.

Description
The length of the shell attains 37.5 mm.

Distribution
This marine species occurs off the Austral Islands, French Polynesia.

References

External links
 Oliverio, M. (2009). Diversity of Coralliophilinae (Mollusca, Neogastropoda, Muricidae) at Austral Islands (South Pacific). Zoosystema. 31(4): 759-789

Coralliophila
Gastropods described in 2009